Felix Brügmann (born 30 November 1992) is a German footballer who plays as a forward for Chemnitzer FC.

Career
On 16 July 2019, Brügmann joined FC Energie Cottbus on a two-year contract.

References

External links
 
 

1992 births
Living people
People from Stormarn (district)
Footballers from Schleswig-Holstein
German footballers
Association football forwards
SV Eichede players
Hamburger SV II players
Altonaer FC von 1893 players
1. FC Lokomotive Leipzig players
Berliner AK 07 players
FC Carl Zeiss Jena players
FC Energie Cottbus players
VSG Altglienicke players
Chemnitzer FC players
3. Liga players
Regionalliga players